Aristaea issikii is a species of moth of the family Gracillariidae. It is known from Honshū, Japan.

The wingspan is 8.2–10.5 mm.

The larvae feed on Aster ageratoides. They mine the leaves of their host plant. There are four instars. In the second instar, the larva makes a large blotch-mine, which occupies an area between the middle vein and margin of leaf, sometimes almost the entire surface. The larva in the third and fourth instars consumes the leaf-tissues within the blotch-mine almost completely. In fully matured condition, the mine becomes a tentiform-type, with irregular longitudinal wrinkles on both the lower and upper sides of the leaf. Pupation takes place inside a whitish, boat-shaped cocoon, which is usually located on the lower side of the same leaf or another one.

References

Aristaea
Moths of Japan
Moths described in 1977